Pradip Sarkar is a politician from West Bengal belonging to All India Trinamool Congress. He was a member of the West Bengal Legislative Assembly.

Biography
Sarkar graduated from Vidyasagar University in 1993. He was elected as the chairman of Kharagpur Municipality. He was elected as a member of the West Bengal Legislative Assembly from Kharagpur Sadar on 28 November 2019. This was the first win for any All India Trinamool Congress candidate from Kharagpur Sadar.

References

Living people
West Bengal MLAs 2016–2021
Trinamool Congress politicians from West Bengal
Vidyasagar University alumni
1970s births
Indian businesspeople
People from Paschim Medinipur district
People from Kharagpur